"Hangin' On" is a song by the Gosdin Brothers, released in August 1967. It has been recorded by numerous artists, including Joe Simon, Ann Peebles, Cher and Cliff Richard.

Charting versions

The Gosdin Brothers

Leon Ashley & Margie Singleton

Joe Simon

Ann Peebles

Vern Gosdin (with Emmylou Harris)

Lane Brody

Cliff Richard version

Richard covered "Hangin' On" in 1974, using the title "(You Keep Me) Hangin' On", as used by Joe Simon and Ann Peebles. It was released as a single in April 1974 with the B-side "Love Is Here", written by Petrina Lordan (who was married to Jerry Lordan) and John Franklin.

Track listing
7": EMI / EMI 2150
 "(You Keep Me) Hangin' On" – 2:59
 "Love Is Here" – 2:02

Personnel
 Cliff Richard – vocals
 Terry Britten – guitar, backing vocals
 Kevin Peek – acoustic guitar
 Alan Tarney – bass guitar, backing vocals
 Trevor Spencer – drums, percussion
 Cliff Hall – keyboards
 Dave MacRae – keyboards
 Gordon Huntley – steel guitar
 Barrie Guard – percussion
 Anna Peacock – backing vocals
 Jean Hawker – backing vocals
 David Mackay – backing vocals

Charts

References

Vern Gosdin songs
Leon Ashley songs
Margie Singleton songs
Joe Simon (musician) songs
Cliff Richard songs
Lane Brody songs
1967 singles
1968 singles

1974 singles
1977 singles
1984 singles
1967 songs
EMI Records singles